is a railway station on the Koumi Line in the town of Sakuho, Minamisaku District, Nagano Prefecture, Japan, operated by East Japan Railway Company (JR East).

Lines
Yachiho Station is served by the Koumi Line, and is 53.9 kilometers from the starting point of the line at Kobuchizawa Station.

Layout
The station has two ground-level opposed side platforms connected by a level crossing.

Platforms

History
It was renamed Yachiho on 1 October 1959. With the privatization of Japanese National Railways (JNR) on 1 April 1987, the station came under the control of JR East.

Passenger statistics
In fiscal 2015, the  station was used by an average of 123 passengers daily (boarding passengers only).

Surrounding area
Chikuma River
former Yachiyo Village Hall

Yachiyo Post Office

See also
List of railway stations in Japan

References

External links

Yachiho Station (JR East)

Railway stations in Nagano Prefecture
Koumi Line
Stations of East Japan Railway Company
Railway stations in Japan opened in 1919
Koumi, Nagano